Hamlet, released in the United States as Hamlet, Prince of Denmark, was a 1907 French short silent film directed by Georges Méliès, based on William Shakespeare's tragedy Hamlet.

Production
The pioneering Parisian filmmaker Georges Méliès had multiple cinematic encounters with the plays of William Shakespeare. The first, his 1901 film The Devil and the Statue, had alluded to Romeo and Juliet by including a balcony scene and Venetian lovers called Roméo and Juliette. (An earlier Méliès work, the 1899 film Robbing Cleopatra's Tomb, is sometimes called simply Cléopatre, but it is not connected to Shakespeare's Antony and Cleopatra.) Méliès also dabbled in Shakespeare in his 1905 film The Venetian Looking-Glass, which incorporates the character of Shylock from The Merchant of Venice. However, these earlier films had merely borrowed elements from Shakespearean works; by contrast, Méliès's 1907 version of Hamlet was a true Shakespearean adaptation.

Méliès himself played Hamlet. Special effects used in the film included multiple exposures.

The film was the first multi-scene cinematic adaptation of any work by Shakespeare. Later in 1907, Méliès made his last Shakespearean film, Shakespeare Writing "Julius Caesar", in which Méliès played Shakespeare himself.

Release and reception
Hamlet was released by Méliès's Star Film Company, and is numbered 980–987 in its catalogues. It was registered for American copyright at the Library of Congress on 15 October 1907.

The film scholar Robert Hamilton Ball, in his study of Shakespearean silent films, highlights the ways in which Méliès adapted the story in order to tell it in truly cinematic language, a historically unprecedented achievement. (Earlier Shakespeare films by others had stuck to purely theatrical techniques, seeking merely to film scenes from the plays as they were performed onstage.) Ball comments: "It is easy to brand this ten-minute film an absurd simplification … but it was nevertheless a distinct advance over anything which had heretofore been achieved in Shakespeare film."

In his book Shakespeare, Cinema, and Society, John Collick compares Méliès's film to the Expressionist theatrical productions of Adolphe Appia and Edward Gordon Craig, saying that Méliès's use of "multiple exposures and dream-like Expressionist imagery … unconsciously recreat[ed] the spirit, if not the intention, of Appia's and Craig's ideas." Collick also highlights that by condensing the play into a brief succession of fragmentary scenes, Méliès was able to concentrate on the theme of madness in an artistically expressive way.

All told, an estimated forty-one film adaptations of Hamlet were made during the silent era. Like many of these, Méliès's version is currently presumed lost.

References

External links

Films directed by Georges Méliès
1907 films
Lost French films
Films based on Hamlet
French silent short films
French black-and-white films
French films based on plays